Trebell Green is a hamlet in the parish of Lanivet, Cornwall, England, United Kingdom.

References

Hamlets in Cornwall